Nick Reynoldson is a stand-up comedian residing in Toronto, Ontario, managed by Comedy Records.

Personal life
    Born and raised in Scarborough, Ontario, Nick Reynoldson's humor is based on his own life. Exclaim Magazine called him “...a staple of Toronto's comedy scene" during his New-Faces Showcase at JFL 42. Topics of Reynoldson's comedy include being mixed race, dating, and his love of animals and marine life.

He is a modern hip hop and rap aficionado and frequently enjoys listening to The Joe Budden Podcast. His favourite thing to do after a big show is to have a nice cold beer and a big dirty greasy cheeseburger.

Reynoldson fell in love with comedy during his high school days after a friend gave him a CD with a bunch of Def Comedy Jam sets on it.

Career Highlights
Reynoldson performed and headlined at comedy clubs, colleges and universities across North America. Reynoldson has appeared at major festivals and featured on national television including Just For Laughs Festival, Kevin Hart’s LOL Network, JFL42 New-Faces, the Winnipeg Comedy Festival, and NXNE. He's been featured on national television networks MTV, MUCH, CBC and multiple national commercials including Captain Morgan's #ScoreLikeACaptain Campaign.

After touring the Canadian Organization of Campus Activities circuit, in 2013, Reynoldson was nominated COCA Comedian of the Year.

In the summer of 2016, Reynoldson also won Absolute Comedy’s annual Prove You're a Headliner competition. Reynoldson beat out eight other contestants and placed first via audience majority vote for 11 straight performances. The following year, Reynoldson filmed and made his US comedy debut on the Kevin Hart’s Laugh Out Loud Network, a comedy video network from comedian Kevin Hart and Lionsgate Films.

In 2018, Reynoldson was selected by SiriusXM and 59 of Canada's funniest comics to take part in the SiriusXM Top Comic Competition, 

Nick Reynoldson was one of eight finalists and performed at the historic Winter Garden Theatre in Toronto, and placed as a runner up nabbing a cash prize and securing spots in JFL42 (Toronto), JFL NorthWest (Vancouver), and returning to the prestigious Montreal's Just for Laughs Festival. His bullet high energy performance was described as engaging, self-deprecating, and possessed a great deal of introspectiveness about his identity as a mixed race person while incorporating the universal themes of families and how they co-exist.

Talking Raptors podcast
Reynoldson co-hosts the weekly (when in season) basketball podcast Talking Raptors on SoundCloud and ESPN's Raptors Republic with fellow comedian and Toronto Raptors fan Barry Taylor.

See also
List of Canadian comedians
Comedy Records

References

Canadian stand-up comedians
Canadian comedy writers
Comedians from Toronto
Living people
Writers from Scarborough, Toronto
Year of birth missing (living people)